Silonia childreni is a species of schilbid catfish endemic to India where it occurs in the Krishna, Godavari and Cauvery River systems of the Western Ghats.  This species grows to a length of  TL.  These fish occur in large rivers and reservoirs. A gregarious fish and move in shoals during monsoon. They feed on fish. S. childreni is a dominant species in the catches from deep waters, especially during the monsoon months between April and July.

References
 

Schilbeidae
Cyprinid fish of Asia
Fauna of the Western Ghats
Freshwater fish of India
Taxa named by William Henry Sykes
Fish described in 1839